Hughie Mulligan (died 1973) was a New York mobster and bookmaker who headed criminal activities of the "Irish Mob" in Hell's Kitchen during the 1950s. His protégés included Jimmy Burke, an associate of the Lucchese crime family, and his eventual successor Mickey Spillane.

Further reading
Clark, Neil G. Dock Boss: Eddie McGrath and the West Side Waterfront. New Jersey: Barricade Books, 2017. .
English, T.J. Paddy Whacked: The Untold Story of the Irish American Gangster. New York: HarperCollins, 2005. 
English, T.J. The Westies: Inside the Hell's Kitchen Irish Mob. St Martin's Paperbacks, 1991. 

Year of birth missing
1973 deaths
American gangsters of Irish descent
American gangsters
American crime bosses
Westies (New York gang)
People from Hell's Kitchen, Manhattan
Criminals from Manhattan
Gangsters from New York City